Arnoglossum diversifolium is a North American species of Arnoglossum and the sunflower family.  It is native to the southeastern United States, the states of Florida, Georgia, and Alabama.

Arnoglossum diversifolium is a large plant sometimes as much as 300 cm (120 inches or 10 feet) tall.  It has white or purple flower heads. The species generally grows in wet soil in swamps or along streambanks.

References

External links

Atlas of Florida Vascular Plants

Senecioneae
Flora of the Southeastern United States
Plants described in 1843
Flora without expected TNC conservation status